The 1969 Sun Bowl was the 36th edition of the college football bowl game, played at the Sun Bowl in El Paso, Texas, on Saturday, December 20. It featured the Georgia Bulldogs of the Southeastern Conference and the fourteenth-ranked Nebraska Cornhuskers of the Big Eight Conference.

Teams

Georgia

Georgia was sixth in the Southeastern Conference; after a  start, the Bulldogs were winless in their last four games to finish the regular season at  It was their second appearance in the Sun Bowl; they won five years earlier.

Nebraska

The Cornhuskers finished as co-champions of the Big Eight Conference with Missouri after losing to them on October 11. While Missouri went to the Orange Bowl, Nebraska made its  first appearance in the Sun Bowl.

Game summary
Ultimately, a favorable wind for one team and a long running quarter proved to be the outlines for victory. Nebraska's Paul Rogers kicked four field goals in the first quarter (50, 32, 42, 37) while also scoring a touchdown run by Jeff Kinney to make it  by the end of the first quarter. It was later determined by Sun Bowl officials that the first quarter had possibly run too long, in part due to a scoreclock malfunction.

While Georgia held the Huskers in the second quarter, Nebraska took back control in the third on two touchdowns, one from a Mike Green touchdown reception from Van Brownson, and the other on a Brownson touchdown run. Dan Schneiss made it  in the fourth on a touchdown plunge of his own. Paul Gilbert scored on a 6-yard touchdown run to get Georgia on the scoreboard. Reserve quarterback Jerry Tagge made the final score  on his 2-yard touchdown run. For his kicking efforts, Rogers was named MVP. The Huskers forced eight Georgia turnovers: two fumbles and six interceptions.

Nebraska finished  and climbed to eleventh in the final AP poll; Georgia fell

Scoring

First quarter
Nebraska – Field goal, Paul Rogers 50
Nebraska – Field goal, Rogers 32
Nebraska – Jeff Kinney 10 run (pass failed)
Nebraska – Field goal, Rogers 42
Nebraska – Field goal, Rogers 37

Second quarter
No scoring

Third quarter
Nebraska – Mike Green 7 pass from Van Brownson (Rogers kick)
Nebraska – Brownson 1 run (Rogers kick)

Fourth quarter
Nebraska – Dan Schneiss 1 run (kick failed)
Georgia – Paul Gilbert 6 run (kick failed)
Nebraska – Jerry Tagge 2 run (Rogers kick)

Statistics
{| class=wikitable style="text-align:center"
! Statistics !!   Georgia    !! Nebraska
|-
|align=left|First downs ||11 ||17
|-
|align=left|Rushing yards ||55 ||190
|-
|align=left|Passing yards ||130|| 165
|-
|align=left|Passes || 11–35–6 || 18–35–2
|-
|align=left|Total yards ||185||355
|-
|align=left|Return yardage ||86||34
|-
|align=left|Fumbles–lost ||2–2 || 1–0
|-
|align=left|Turnovers by || 8 || 2
|-
|align=left|Punts–average ||10–42.2||7–35.6
|-
|align=left|Penalties–yards ||3–31||6–50 
|}

Aftermath
Nebraska won national championships in the next two seasons and this was the first of six straight bowl wins, the last five in major bowls. The Huskers returned to the Sun Bowl in 1980 and Georgia in 1985.

References

Sun Bowl
Sun Bowl
Georgia Bulldogs football bowl games
Nebraska Cornhuskers football bowl games
1969 in sports in Texas
December 1969 sports events in the United States